Hale Freeman Trotter (30 May 1931 – 17 January 2022) was a Canadian-American mathematician, known for the Lie–Trotter product formula, the Steinhaus–Johnson–Trotter algorithm, and the Lang–Trotter conjecture. He was born in Kingston, Ontario. He died in Princeton, New Jersey on January 17, 2022.

Biography 
The son of historian Reginald George Trotter, Hale Trotter studied at Queen's University in Kingston with bachelor's degree in 1952 and master's degree in 1953. He received in 1956 his PhD from Princeton University under William Feller with thesis Convergence of semigroups of operators. Trotter was from 1956 to 1958 at Princeton University the Fine Instructor for mathematics and from 1958 to 1960 an assistant professor at Queen's University. He was from 1962 to 1963 a visiting associate professor, from 1963 to 1969 an associate professor, and from 1969 until his retirement a full professor at Princeton University. From 1962 to 1986 he was an associate director for Princeton University's data center.

Trotter's research dealt with, among other topics, probability theory, group theory computations, number theory, and knot theory. In 1963, he solved an open problem in knot theory by proving that there are non-invertible knots. At the time of his proof, all knots with up to 7 crossings were known to be invertible. Trotter described an infinite number of pretzel knots that are not invertible.

Selected publications

Articles
"A property of Brownian motion paths." Illinois Journal of Mathematics 2, no. 3 (1958): 425–433.
"Homology of group systems with applications to knot theory." Annals of Mathematics (1962): 464–498. 
with Stephen W. Goldfeld and Richard E. Quandt: "Maximization by quadratic hill-climbing." Econometrica: Journal of the Econometric Society (1966): 541–551. 
"On the norms of units in quadratic fields." Proc. Amer. Math. Soc. 22 (1969), 198–201. 
"On S-equivalence of Seifert matrices." Inventiones mathematicae 20, no. 3 (1973): 173–207. 
with Serge Lang: "Primitive points on elliptic curves." Bull. Amer. Math. Soc. 83 (1977), 289–292. 
"Eigenvalue distributions of large Hermitian matrices; Wigner's semi-circle law and a theorem of Kac, Murdock, and Szegö." Advances in Mathematics 54, no. 1 (1984): 67–82.

Books
 with Richard Williamson and Richard Crowell: Calculus of vector functions, Prentice-Hall 1972
 with Williamson: Multivariable Mathematics, Prentice-Hall 1995
 with Serge Lang: Frobenius distributions in GL2-extensions: distribution of Frobenius automorphisms in GL2-extensions of the rational numbers, Lecture Notes in Mathematics 504, Springer Verlag 1976;

References

External links
 Hale Trotter, Department of Mathematics, Princeton University
 
 Selected advances in knot theory, CSI Math, cuny.edu

1931 births
2022 deaths
People from Kingston, Ontario
Princeton University alumni
Princeton University faculty
Queen's University at Kingston alumni
20th-century American mathematicians
21st-century American mathematicians
20th-century Canadian mathematicians
21st-century Canadian mathematicians
Canadian emigrants to the United States